Partners Again is a 1926 American silent comedy film that was produced by Samuel Goldwyn, released through United Artists, and directed by Henry King.

This ethnic Jewish humor film is based on the 1922 Broadway play Partners Again starring Alex Carr and Barney Bernard, which reprises their characters from the very successful 1913 Broadway play Potash and Perlmutter (which had 441 performances from 1913 to 1915). Goldwyn produced a 1923 film adaptation of Potash and Perlmutter, and a 1924 sequel called In Hollywood with Potash and Perlmutter. In Partners Again the two are in the automobile industry.

As with the 1924 film, In Hollywood with Potash and Perlmutter, George Sidney plays Potash, taking up the role after Barney Bernard died in March of that year. Alex Carr continues his winning role of Perlmutter. What is interesting about this film is that it is one of the two American films that only survives in 8mm.

Cast

References

External links

1926 films
American black-and-white films
American silent feature films
1920s English-language films
Films directed by Henry King
Samuel Goldwyn Productions films
Silent American comedy films
1926 comedy films
1920s American films